The third series of The Green Green Grass originally aired between 2 November 2007 and 21 December 2007, beginning with the episode "But is it Art?". A Christmas special aired on 30 December 2007.

Outline
The series continued to feature the seven main characters that appeared in series one. These were: 

Lisa Diveney's character, Beth, who was Tyler's girlfriend, was regular throughout the series before leaving the series after the special. Ray (Nigel Harrison) was also a regular throughout the series. Llewellyn (Alan David) only made one appearance in the series, and subsequently appeared in the following Christmas Special.

Episodes

Note

No episode was aired on 16 November 2007 because of BBC One's coverage of Children In Need. Episode 3 was moved back a week because of this.

Production
The series was produced by Shazam Production, a company that produces comedies by John Sullivan. The series was filmed at Teddington Studios, with a live audience. All episodes in the first series were directed by Dewi Humphreys. This particular series was written by Jim Sullivan, John Sullivan, Keith Lindsay and David Cantor.

Reception

Viewers
The series began airing on Friday evenings, at 8:30pm. The series continued to be hit with viewers, with the first episode, "But is it Art?" gaining 5.34 million viewers, which was in the top thirty highest ratings for the week ending 4 November 2007. Ratings then fell for the next two episodes before rising for the fifth, then dropping again for the next episode, rising again for the sixth and ending on a series low. The ratings were high enough for a last series of nine episodes, which was commissioned and aired.

Critics
The series, as a spin-off of the nation's favourite sitcom, was always going to have a difficult start. The series continued to receive negative reviews from critics and some fans of Only Fools and Horses as well, but a few positive reviews began to emerge. The series achieved having the first episode to gain a six million plus viewing figure since the first series.

References
Specific

General
The Green Green Grass at BBC Comedy
The Green Green Grass - official website
The Green Green Grass at British TV Comedy
British Sitcom Guide for The Green Green Grass
The Green Green Grass at Only Fools and Horses website
 

2007 British television seasons
The Green Green Grass